George Koller (born December 9, 1958) is a Canadian bassist who has played free jazz, folk music, world music, and world fusion.

Career
Koller has worked with  Bruce Cockburn, William Beauvais, Holly Cole, Peter Gabriel,  Graeme Kirkland, Loreena McKennitt, The Shuffle Demons, Toronto Tabla Ensemble, Richard Underhill, Phil Woods, David Clayton-Thomas, Autorickshaw, Larry Coryell, Herb Ellis, Art Farmer,  Dizzy Gillespie,  Eddie Harris, Moe Koffman, Ron Korb, Doug Riley, Valdy, Jane Siberry, Sonny Stitt, and Mary Wilson of The Supremes.

Awards
HMV Fresh Blood Grand Prize, Music for Plants, Animals, and Humans

Discography

As leader
 Music for Plants, Animals, and Humans (ZSAN 1994) 
 Singing Naked (ZSAN 1995) 
 Internal Arts (ZSAN 1003)
 Chants de Lumieres (ZSAN 1004)
 Travelin' Light (ZSAN 1005)
 Atmosphere of Bliss (ZSAN 1006)

With The Shuffle Demons
 What Do You Want? (1990)
 Alive in Europe (1992)

As sideman
With Tisziji Munoz
 Space of Fire (Anami Music, 2015)
 When Coltrane Calls! Session 1: Fierce Compassion (Anami Music, 2016)
 When Coltrane Calls! Session 3: Living Immortality (Anami Music, 2016)
 When Coltrane Calls! Session 2: Liberation First! (Anami Music, 2017)

With others
 Lori Cullen, Garden Path (2000)
 Michael Kaeshammer, No Strings Attached  (2000)
 Loreena McKennitt, The Visit  (1991)

References

1958 births
Living people
20th-century Canadian double-bassists
20th-century Canadian male musicians
21st-century Canadian double-bassists
21st-century Canadian male musicians
Canadian jazz double-bassists
Canadian male jazz musicians
Male double-bassists
Musicians from Edmonton
The Shuffle Demons members